Dot notation may refer to:
 Newton's notation for differentiation (see also Notation for differentiation)
 Lewis dot notation also known as Electron dot notation
 Dot-decimal notation
 Kepatihan notation
 Dotted note

 DOT language

Dot notation is also used in:
 Lisp (programming language)
 Object-oriented programming as syntactic sugar for accessing properties.
 Earley algorithm

See also 
 Dot convention